Md Rafiqul Islam is a retired Bangladesh Army major general and former Director General of Border Guards Bangladesh.

Career
Islam joined the Signals Corps of the Bangladesh Army on 30 November 1976. He served in the Military Operation Directorate as its GSO. He was the assistant private secretary to the Chief of Army Staff. From 1993 to 1994 he served as the deputy regional commander of the United Nations Operation in Mozambique. He was the commandant of the Signal Training School and College and served as the commandant of two signal battalions. He also served as the staff colonel of an infantry division.

Islam served as the Director of Signals in the Bangladesh Army Headquarters. He served in the Prime Minister's Office and the Armed Forces Division as the director of operations. He was appointed Director General of Border Guards Bangladesh on 11 May 2011. He presided over the special court no-3 of Border Guards Bangladesh that tried mutineers of the Bangladesh Rifles Mutiny of 2009. He also presided over special court no-7 of the BDR trial. He left the Bangladesh Border Guards on 1 July 2011 and was replaced by Major General Anwar Hussain. On 14 July 2011, he went on leave prior to his retirement.

References

Living people
Bangladesh Army generals
Director Generals of Border Guards Bangladesh
Year of birth missing (living people)